Hurricane in the Tropics (Italian:Uragano ai tropici) is a 1939 Italian adventure film directed by Pier Luigi Faraldo and Gino Talamo and starring Fosco Giachetti, Rubi D'Alma, and Osvaldo Valenti. The film is based on a novel by Anton Giulio Majano. The film was shot at the Fert Studios in Turin, with sets designed by Ottavio Scotti.

Cast
 Fosco Giachetti as Il capitano Moraes  
 Rubi D'Alma as Manoela Moraes  
 Osvaldo Valenti as Il tenente Reguero  
 Mino Doro as Nichols  
 Vinicio Sofia as Il radiotelegrafista 
 Danilo Calamai 
 Aristide Garbini 
 Antimo Reyner

References

Bibliography
 Poppi, Roberto Dizionario Del Cinema Italiano. I film: Tutti i film italiani dal 1930 al 1944.

External links 

1939 films
Italian adventure films
1939 adventure films
1930s Italian-language films
Films directed by Enrico Guazzoni
Italian black-and-white films
1930s Italian films